Lucas Bradley (1809–1889) was an American architect in Racine, Wisconsin. He designed the Eli R. Cooley House in Racine, Wisconsin, the John Collins House, George Murray House (Racine, Wisconsin) and Racine College.

Bradley was born in Geneva, New York. He apprenticed at Auburn, New York, lived in St. Louis and then moved to Racine in 1843. He is known for designing the Second Presbyterian Church of St. Louis and the First Presbyterian Church in Racine, notable examples of Greek Revival architecture.

He died at his home in Racine.

Work
Second Presbyterian Church (St. Louis, Missouri)
Eli R. Cooley House in Racine
Aaron Lucius Chapin House (1851) at 709 College Avenue in Beloit
First Presbyterian Church (Racine, Wisconsin) (1852) at 716 College Avenue in Racine 
First Congregational Church of Beloit (1862) at 801 Bushnell Street in Beloit, Wisconsin (destroyed by fire 1998)
George Murray House (Racine, Wisconsin) (1874) at 2219 Washington Avenue in Racine
John Collins House, 6409 Nicholson Road in Caledonia, Wisconsin
 Three Garfield schools (later remodeled by James Gilbert Chandler)
Bridge in Racine
 Second building for Racine College, the Kemper Building
 Campbell Hall for Beloit College

References

Further reading
Lucas Bradley, carpenter, builder, architect by Helen Patton (Helen Frances)  p. 107-125 : ill. ; 26 cm. OCLC: ocn746225712 Wisconsin Magazine Of History. Volume: 58 /Issue: 2 (1974-1975)

Architects from Wisconsin
People from Geneva, New York
People from Racine, Wisconsin
1809 births
1889 deaths
19th-century American architects